In mathematics, the Cartan–Kähler theorem is a major result on the integrability conditions for differential systems, in the case of analytic functions, for differential ideals . It is named for Élie Cartan and Erich Kähler.

Meaning
There is a problem caused by singular solutions. The theorem computes certain constants that must satisfy an inequality in order that there be a solution.

Statement 
Let  be a real analytic EDS.

Moreover, assume there is a real analytic submanifold  of codimension  containing  and such that  has dimension  for all .

Then there exists a (locally) unique connected, -dimensional, real analytic integral manifold  of  that satisfies .

Proof and assumptions
The Cauchy-Kovalevskaya theorem is used in the proof, so the analyticity is necessary.

References
Jean Dieudonné, Eléments d'analyse, vol. 4, (1977) Chapt. XVIII.13
R. Bryant, S. S. Chern, R. Gardner, H. Goldschmidt, P. Griffiths, Exterior Differential Systems, Springer Verlag, New York, 1991.

External links

R. Bryant, "Nine Lectures on Exterior Differential Systems", 1999
 E. Cartan, "On the integration of systems of total differential equations," transl. by D. H. Delphenich
 E. Kähler, "Introduction to the theory of systems of differential equations," transl. by D. H. Delphenich

Partial differential equations
Theorems in analysis